Ruth Warren (March 27, 1901 - July 9, 1986) was an American film and television actress.

Career
Warren started her career as a contractor at Fox Studios. She started her acting career in the film Lightnin', followed by Men on Call, Doctors' Wives, Devil's Lottery, The Last Trail, Merry Wives of Reno, The Farmer Takes a Wife, Her Master's Voice, Partners in Crime, Prison Farm, When Tomorrow Comes, Sailor's Lady, and House of Wax during the 1930s, 1940s and 1950s.

She also appeared on television in Ford Theatre, Annie Oakley, Celebrity Playhouse, The Millionaire, Lux Video Theatre, Chevron Hall of Stars, and Thriller during the 1950s and 1960s.

Filmography

Film
 Lightnin' (1930) - Mrs. Margaret Davis
 Men on Call (1931) - Mrs. Burke
 Doctors' Wives (1931) - Nurse Charlotte
 Mr. Lemon of Orange (1931) - Mrs. Hilda Blake
 Women of All Nations (1931) - Ruth (uncredited)
 Annabelle's Affairs (1931) - Lottie
 The Guilty Generation (1931) - Nellie Weaver
 Devil's Lottery (1932) - Maid (uncredited)
 Hello Trouble (1932) - Emmy
 Face in the Sky (1933) - Fairgrounds Spectator (uncredited)
 State Fair (1933) - Mrs. Edwin Metcalfe (uncredited)
 Zoo in Budapest (1933) - Katrina
 Mama Loves Papa (1933) - Sara Walker
 The Last Trail (1933) - Sally Scott Olsen
 Bombshell (1933) - Miss Carroll from Photoplay Magazine (uncredited)
 The Perils of Pauline (1933) - Stewardess (uncredited)
 The House on 56th Street (1933) -  Jail Inmate (uncredited)
 Let's Fall in Love (1933) - Nellie
 The Big Shakedown (1934) - Sheffner's Secretary (uncredited)
 Merry Wives of Reno (1934) - Second Beautician (uncredited)
 Now I'll Tell (1934) - Minor Role (uncredited)
 Doubting Thomas (1935) - Jenny
 The Farmer Takes a Wife (1935) - Mrs. Lansing (uncredited)
 The Gay Deception (1935) - Linen Maid (uncredited)
 Freshman Love  (1936) - Marie - Housemother (uncredited)
 Her Master's Voice (1936) - Phoebe
 Small Town Girl (1936) - Mrs. Agnes Haines (uncredited)
 Forgotten Faces (1936) - Nurse
 Spendthrift (1936) - Eleanor - Uncle Morton Middleton's Secretary (uncredited)
 Pepper (1936) - Tenement Woman (uncredited)
 Our Relations (1936) - Mrs. Addlequist (uncredited)
 A Doctor's Diary (1937) - Poor Mother (uncredited)
 Make Way for Tomorrow (1937) - Secretary (uncredited)
 Forlorn River (1937) - Millie Moran - the Cook
 Topper (1937) - Hen-Pecked Motorist's Wife (uncredited)
 Partners in Crime (1937) - Miss Brown (uncredited)
 Breakfast for Two (1937) -  Jane (uncredited)
 45 Fathers (1937) - Sarah
 Big Town Girl (1937) - Customer (uncredited)
 Wells Fargo (1937) - Mrs. Andrews (uncredited)
 Island in the Sky (1938) - Nurse (uncredited)
 Prison Farm (1938) - Prisoner Josie (uncredited)
 Passport Husband (1938) - Apartment House Manager (uncredited)
 Five of a Kind (1938) - Mrs. Leona Hudson (uncredited)
 The Girl Downstairs (1938) - Euphasia, the Cook (uncredited)
 Inside Story (1939) - Townswoman (uncredited)
 Money to Loan (1939) - Loan Victim's Wife (uncredited)
 Union Pacific (1939) - Mrs. Cassidy (uncredited)
 When Tomorrow Comes (1939) - Waitress (uncredited)
 The Cisco Kid and the Lady (1939) - Effie Saunders
 Remember the Night (1940) - Undetermined role (uncredited)
 The Shop Around the Corner (1940) - Customer (uncredited)
 City of Chance (1940) - Wife - in Montage (uncredited)
 I Take This Woman (1940) - Bridget O'Sullivan (scenes deleted)
 The House Across the Bay (1940) - Prisoner's Wife (uncredited)
 Women Without Names (1940) - Roomer (uncredited)
 Free, Blonde and 21 (1940) - Nurse (uncredited)
 Beyond Tomorrow (1940) - Arlene's Maid (uncredited)
 Alias the Deacon (1940) - Lady with Baby (uncredited)
 Sailor's Lady (1940) - Mother (uncredited)
 Manhattan Heartbeat (1940) - Nurse
 Young People (1940) - uncredited
 For Beauty's Sake (1941) - Nurse (uncredited)
 The Man Who Wouldn't Die (1942) - Peggy - the Cook (uncredited)
 Lady in a Jam (1942) - Drunk (uncredited)
 Thru Different Eyes (1942) - Julia
 Jackass Mail (1942) - Doctor's Wife (uncredited)
 Dixie Dugan (1943) - Sergeant's Wife
 Good Morning, Judge (1943) - Katie Bevins (uncredited)
 My Kingdom for a Cook (1943) - Cook (uncredited)
 The Song of Bernadette (1943) - Townswoman (uncredited)
 Pin Up Girl (1944) - Scrubwoman (uncredited)
 Once Upon a Time (1944) - Fatso's Mother (uncredited)
 She's a Soldier Too (1944) - Maggie (uncredited)
 Strange Affair (1944) - Irate Woman at Police Lineup (uncredited)
 She's a Sweetheart (1944) - Edith
 Lake Placid Serenade (1944) - Cleaning Woman (uncredited)
 Tomorrow, the World! (1944) - Undetermined role (unconfirmed, uncredited)
 Roughly Speaking (film) (1945) - Tub Customer (uncredited)
 Keep Your Powder Dry (1945) - WAC (uncredited)
 Three's a Crowd (1945)
 Twice Blessed (1945) - Maid (uncredited)
 Adventures of Rusty (1945) - Mrs. Florence Nelson (uncredited)
 Week-End at the Waldorf (1945) - Telephone operator (uncredited)
 A Close Call for Boston Blackie (1946) - Milkwoman (uncredited)
 Cinderella Jones (1946) - Faded Lady (uncredited)
 Talk About a Lady (1946) - Gossip (uncredited)
 King of the Wild Horses (1947) - Jane Acker
 Sitting Pretty (1948) - Matron (uncredited)
 Canon City (1948) - Mug's Wife
 The Snake Pit (1948) - Patient (uncredited)
 The Lone Wolf and His Lady (1949) - Police Matron (uncredited)
 Mary Ryan, Detective (1949) - Prison Matron (uncredited)
 Bodyhold (1949) - Kitty Cassidy
 Side Street (1950) - Lucky's Housekeeper (uncredited)
 Military Academy with That Tenth Avenue Gang (1950) - Mac's Mother (uncredited)
 In a Lonely Place (1950) - Effie (uncredited)
 Return of the Frontiersman (1950) - Gossiping Woman (uncredited)
 No Way Out (1950) - Sam's Wife (uncredited)
 Between Midnight and Dawn (1950) - Policewoman (uncredited)
 He's a Cockeyed Wonder (1950) - Jenny Morrison - Landlady (uncredited)
 Emergency Wedding (1950) - Shopper (uncredited)
 My True Story (1951) - Mrs. White (uncredited)
 Her First Romance (1951) - Mrs. Marsh (uncredited)
 Never Trust a Gambler (1951) - Mrs. Ginger Gillis (uncredited)
 Corky of Gasoline Alley (1951) - Mrs. Noble (uncredited)
 Sound Off (1952) - Billy's Mother (uncredited)
 Montana Territory (1952) - Mrs. Nelson (uncredited)
 O. Henry's Full House (1952) - Neighbor (segment "The Last Leaf") (uncredited)
 Monkey Business (1952) - Laundress (uncredited)
 Man in the Dark (1953) - Mayme (uncredited)
 House of Wax (1953) - Scrubwoman (uncredited)
 Powder River (1953) - Townswoman (uncredited)
 The Kid from Left Field (1953) - Welfare Worker (uncredited)
 The Long, Long Trailer (1954) - Mrs. Dudley (uncredited)
 A Star Is Born (1954) - Shrine Auditorium Reporter (uncredited)
 Prince of Players (1955) -  Nurse in `Romeo and Juliet´ (uncredited) 
 Wyoming Renegades (1955) - Mrs. Oliver (uncredited)
 Bring Your Smile Along (1955) - Mrs. Klein, Landlady
 My Sister Eileen (1955) - Matron (uncredited)
 Fury at Gunsight Pass (1955) - Townswoman (uncredited)
 The Phantom Stagecoach (1957) - Townswoman (uncredited)
 The Wayward Bus (1957) - Bit Role (uncredited)
 Escape from San Quentin (1957) - Perturbed Racetrack Patron (uncredited)
 Screaming Mimi (1958) - Mrs. Myers (uncredited)
 The Last Hurrah (1958) - Ellen Davin (uncredited)
 Auntie Mame (1958) - Mrs. Jennings (uncredited)

Television
 The Ford Television Theatre - Girl in the Park (1952) TV Episode - Wonderful Day for a Wedding (1954) TV Episode
 Annie Oakley - Sure Shot Annie (1955) TV Episode .... Mrs. Bickel
 Celebrity Playhouse - My Name Is Sally Roberts (1956) TV Episode
 The Millionaire - The Cindy Bowen Story (1956) TV Episode .... Nurse Olsen
 Lux Video Theatre - To Each His Own (1954) TV Episode .... Mrs. Ingram - An Act of Murder (1955) TV Episode .... Mrs. Russell - Perilous Deception (1955) TV Episode .... Mrs. Beacham - A Yankee Cousin (1956) TV Episode .... Mrs. Sherman
 Chevron Hall of Stars - Mr. Thompson (1956) TV Episode - Double Cross (1956) TV Episode
 December Bride - Mother-in-Law Club (1957) TV Episode .... Mrs. Hopkinson
 Maverick (TV series) - The Lonesome Reunion (1958) TV Episode .... Local Gossip
 The Gray Ghost - The Master Spy (1958) TV Episode .... Dorothy
 Lawman - The Ring (1959) TV Episode .... Angie Spender
 Thriller - Late Date (1961) TV Episode .... Mrs. Rooney

References

External links
  

1901 births
1986 deaths
American film actresses
American television actresses
20th-century American actresses
People from Louisiana